Luis Méndez de Haro, 6th Marquis of Carpio or Luis Méndez de Haro y Guzmán, Grandee of Spain (in full), (1598 – 26 November 1661), was a Spanish nobleman, political figure and general.

Biography
Luis Méndez de Haro y Guzmán was the son of don Diego de Haro, the marquis of Carpio, and of doña Francisca de Guzmán, the sister of the Count-Duke Olivares.

Méndez de Haro made a career at the Spanish court under the protection of his uncle, Gaspar de Guzmán, Count-Duke of Olivares,
whom he succeeded as Valido or the court favourite who enjoyed the friendship and trust of the king and who wielded political power, after the Count-Duke was driven from office in 1643.
He would never exert the same type of influence or control as his uncle had, mainly due to King Philip IV's reliance upon Sister María de Ágreda's counsel. She was able to influence the king to abolish the function of valido.

Luis de Méndez Haro was the main Spanish negotiator of the Treaty of the Pyrenees on Pheasant Island in 1659. He was unable to avoid any perceived negative result of the treaty, nor was he able to reach an anti-French accord with the Lord Protector of the Commonwealth of England, Scotland, and Ireland, Oliver Cromwell. The treaty was accompanied by the marriage of King Louis XIV of France and the Infanta Maria Theresa of Spain. Luis de Méndez Haro played the part of the bridegroom in the proxy marriage that took place at Fuenterrabia on 3 June 1660.

Méndez de Haro's main success was the suppression of the Catalan uprising, and the reconquest of Barcelona in 1652.

However, his campaign during the Portuguese Restoration War was a complete failure. Luis de Méndez Haro personally led Spanish troops at the Battle of the Lines of Elvas in 1659, which ended in a total Spanish defeat.

On 26 April 1625, in Barcelona, Luis de Méndez Haro married Catalina (26 April 1610 – 19 November 1647), the youngest daughter of Enrique de Córdoba Cardona y Aragón. They had 5 children:
Gaspar, (1629–1687), his successor and the Viceroy of Naples.
Juan Domingo (1640–1716), Governor of the Habsburg Netherlands and the Viceroy of Catalonia.
Francisco was an illegitimate son of Luis, but acknowledged by his father. Francisco may have been conceived before Luis's marriage, while involved as majordomo for the young future King Felipe IV
Antonia, who had married Gaspar Juan Pérez de Guzmán, 10th Duke of Medina Sidonia.
Manuela, who had married Gaspar Vigil de Quiñones Alonso Pimentel y Benavides.
María Méndez (1644–1693), who had married Gregorio María Domingo de Silva Mendoza y Sandoval.

Sources

Spanish politicians
Spanish generals
Spanish Baroque people
1598 births
1661 deaths
Grandees of Spain
Counts of Olivares
Dukes of Olivares
Luis Mendez
Marquesses of Spain
Marquesses of Carpio
17th-century Spanish people